The Appanoose Formation is a geologic formation in Missouri. It preserves fossils dating back to the Carboniferous period.

See also

 List of fossiliferous stratigraphic units in Missouri
 Paleontology in Missouri

References

External links
 https://mrdata.usgs.gov/geology/state/fips-unit.php?code=f19007
 https://ngmdb.usgs.gov/Geolex/UnitRefs/AppanooseRefs_6507.html
 https://ir.uiowa.edu/cgi/viewcontent.cgi?referer=https://www.google.com/&httpsredir=1&article=1012&context=igsar

Carboniferous Missouri
Carboniferous southern paleotropical deposits